Contact may refer to:

Interaction

Physical interaction
 Contact (geology), a common geological feature
 Contact lens or contact, a lens placed on the eye
 Contact sport, a sport in which players make contact with other players or objects
 Contact juggling
 Contact mechanics, the study of solid objects that deform when touching each other
 Contact process (mathematics), a model of an interacting particle system
 Electrical contacts
 Sparśa, a concept in Buddhism that in Sanskrit/Indian language is translated as "contact", "touching", "sensation", "sense impression", etc.

Social interaction
 Contact (amateur radio)
 Contact (law), a concept related to visitation rights
 Contact (social), a person who can offer help in achieving goals
 Contact Conference, an annual scientific conference
 Extraterrestrial contact, see Search for extraterrestrial intelligence
 First contact (anthropology), an initial meeting of two cultures
 Language contact, the interaction of two or more languages

Arts, entertainment, and media

Films
 The Contact (1963 film), educational film starring John Hurt
 Contact (1978 film), a Soviet animated short film
 Contact (1992 film), a short film by Jonathan Darby, with Brad Pitt
 Contact (1997 American film), a science fiction drama film adapted from the Carl Sagan novel
 The Contact (1997 South Korean film), (접속 Jeopsok, "connection"), a romance film
 Contact, a 2002 short film by Kieran Galvin
 Contact (2009 film), an Australian documentary film

Games
 Contact (tile game)
 Contact (video game), a 2006 role-playing video game
 Contact, a social word-guessing game similar to Botticelli

Music

Albums 

 Contact (ATB album)
 Contact (Boney James album)
 Contact (Fancy album)
 Contact (Fantastic Plastic Machine album)
 Contact (Freda Payne album)
 Contact (Indo G album)
 Contact (Mad Heads album)
 Contact (Minori Chihara album)
 Contact (Noisettes album)
 Contact (Platinum Blonde album)
 Contact (Pointer Sisters album)
 Contact (Silver Apples album)
 Contact (Thirteen Senses album)
 Contact, an album by The Benjamin Gate
 Contact! (Eiffel 65 album), 2001
 Contact! (Ray Barretto album), 1998

Songs
 "Contact" (Daft Punk song) (2013)
 "Contact" (Edwin Starr song) (1978)
 "Contact", a song by Anthrax from We've Come for You All
 "Contact", a song by Big Audio Dynamite from Megatop Phoenix
 "Contact", a song by Brigitte Bardot
 "Contact", a song by Brooklyn Bounce
 "Contact", a song by Kyo from 300 Lésions
 "Contact", a song by Glenn Morrison
 "Contact", a song by Phish from Junta
 "Contact", a song by The Police from Reggatta de Blanc
 "Contact", a song by Spirit from Rapture in the Chambers
 "Contact", a song from the musical Rent

Television
 "Contact", a 1995 episode of Lois & Clark: The New Adventures of Superman
 "Contact" (Saving Hope), a 2012 episode of Saving Hope

Literature
 Contact (magazine), an American literary "little magazine"
 Contact (novel), a novel by Carl Sagan
 The Contact, a 1985 novel by Garikai Mutasa

Other uses in arts, entertainment, and media
 Contact (musical), a 1999 dance play
 Contact (The Culture), a fictional organization in the works of Iain M. Banks

Brands and enterprises
 Contact Air, an airline
 Contact Energy, an energy company
 Contact Theatre, a multi-disciplinary arts venue in Manchester, England

Other uses
 Contact, Nevada, USA; an unincorporated community 
 Contact (mathematics), an equivalence relation
 Contact print, a kind of photographic image
 Contact process, a method of producing sulfuric acid
 Transit (astronomy)#Contacts, specific points in time during a transit or eclipse
 Contact Lens, a lens worn directly on the eye
 Contact paper or contact, a self-adhesive, PVC or paper film, used for covering or lining

See also

 
 3-2-1 Contact, an American science educational television show
 Contac, a medication brand
 Contactor, an electrically controlled switch used for switching a power circuit
 Touch (disambiguation)
 Kontakt (disambiguation)
 Kontact
 Contakt